Round Lake Historic District can refer to:
 Round Lake Historic District (St. Petersburg, Florida)
 Round Lake Historic District (Round Lake, New York)